Paramedics is a 1988 comedy film starring George Newbern and Christopher McDonald.

Plot
When this group of rowdy and raunchy, laid-back medics are transferred from their cushy uptown district to the rough south-end, they find plenty of trouble when they discover the tough guys are playing a "corpses-for-dollars" scam and they want to crack the case. Mike "Mad Mike" and "Uptown", having been sent to the new district by their boss, Captain Prescott, as a form of punishment, soon discover that two paramedics are working with gang members in order to provide dead bodies, which would be harvested for organs to be sold on the Black Market. So they decide to bring down the black market and their old boss, who has nothing to do with the black market, but has ended up their boss again in the South District. All of this Uptown is dealing with his girlfriend, Savannah, who wants him to focus and go to med school, and Mad Mike, who is smitten with a French woman (Liette), who is transporting a heart from France that is needed for a transplant.

There is a subplot about a mystery woman named "Danger Girl" who seduces her lovers to the point they meet with bizarre accidents, as was the case of the judge who had a near fatal heart attack and a man who drove his car into a water fountain. At the end of the film, she meets up with Captain Prescott, who much to his chagrin, has been named Deputy Chief of the South District, on the recommendation of heroes Uptown and Mad Mike, who receive special recognition for breaking up the black market scheme.

Cast
 George Newbern as "Uptown"
 Christopher McDonald as Mike "Mad Mike"
 John P. Ryan as Captain Prescott
 James Noble as Chief Wilkins
 John Pleshette as Dr. Lido
 Elaine Wilkes as Savannah
 Lydie Denier as Liette
 Lawrence Hilton-Jacobs as "Blade Runner"
 Karen Witter as "Danger Girl"
 Ray Walston as Heart Attack Patient 
 Leigh Hamilton as Despatcher
 Peter Isackson as Breedlove
 Eric Boardman as White
 Lisa Applewhite as Nurse Helms
 Helanie Lembeck as Lieutenant Holcomb
 Bill Johnson as Caesar "Big Caesar"

Release
The film was given a limited release in the United States by Vestron Pictures on June 3rd 1988. Opening on 301 screens, the film's opening weekend gross was $149,577. Vestron would stop tracking the film after its first weekend.

DVD release
Lions Gate Home Entertainment has not announced any current plans to release the film onto DVD.

Notes

References

External links
 
 

1988 films
1980s sex comedy films
American sex comedy films
1980s English-language films
Films shot in Dallas
Medical-themed films
Vestron Pictures films
Teen sex comedy films
1988 comedy films
Films directed by Stuart Margolin
1980s American films